Moronata eriosocii is a species of moth of the family Tortricidae. It is found in Morona-Santiago Province, Ecuador.

References

Moths described in 2003
Euliini